Naomi Donne is a British make-up artist. She has been nominated for two Academy Awards in the category Best Makeup and Hairstyling for the films 1917 and Cruella.

Selected filmography 
 1917 (2019; co-nominated with Tristan Versluis and Rebecca Cole)
 Cruella (2021; co-nominated with Nadia Stacey and Julia Vernon)

References

External links 

Living people
Year of birth missing (living people)
Place of birth missing (living people)
British make-up artists